F. Winold Reiss (September 16, 1886 – August 23, 1953) was a German-born American artist and graphic designer. He was born in Karlsruhe, Germany, the second son of Fritz Reiss (1857–1914) and his wife. He grew up surrounded by art, as his father was a well-known landscape artist and his brother became a sculptor.

Reiss became a portraitist. His philosophy was that an artist must travel to find the most interesting subjects; influenced by his father and his own curiosity, he drew subjects from many peoples and walks of life. In 1913 he immigrated to the United States, where he was able to follow his interest in Native Americans. In 1920 he went West for the first time, working for a lengthy period on the Blackfeet Reservation. Over the years Reiss painted more than 250 works depicting Native Americans. These paintings by Reiss became known more widely beginning in the 1920 and to the 1950s, when the Great Northern Railway commissioned Reiss to do paintings of the Blackfeet which were then distributed widely as lithographed reproductions on Great Northern calendars. In 1931, and 1934-37, Reiss organized a summer art school, also referred to as an artists' colony near Glacier National Park.

Biography 

In his early years, Reiss traveled within Germany with his father, who studied peasants of particular types that he wanted to draw or paint.  This helped form many of Reiss's ideas about subject matter for portraiture. His brother Hans Reiss also became an artist, working as a sculptor. He also immigrated to the United States.

Winold Reiss immigrated to America in 1913. Like many Europeans he had been captivated by stories and images of Native Americans. He was excited to think he might be able to paint them. In January 1920, he finally got to go to the West, and spent months on the Blackfeet Reservation in Montana, painting 36 portraits of tribal members. He made relationships that he kept for the rest of his life, and returned to the West to paint Native Americans.

Reiss first had clients among the ethnic Germans in New York but by 1915, he was lecturing before the Art Students League. He founded a publication, Modern Art Collector. He made more than 250 paintings of Native Americans, especially the Blackfeet of Montana.

In 1921 Reiss returned once to Germany for a visit, and settled again in New York City in 1922, where he opened an art school.

Reiss illustrated Alain Locke's historic 1925 anthology The New Negro, an important book about African American culture at the time of the Harlem Renaissance. Reprintings of the book, however, have dropped Reiss’s name from the title page and deleted the portfolio of portraits he contributed to the original edition. These included drawings of such key figures as W. E. B. Du Bois, Charles Johnson, and Elise McDougald. The changes were documented by scholar George Bornstein. George Hutchinson builds on Bornstein’s research to speculate that this may be because of the controversy surrounding the portraits, which depict some of these distinguished African American figures with notably dark skins and features that may suggest caricature, though others are brown or of light complexion. Reiss was a white artist, and so subsequent editors may have felt his work shouldn’t have been included. The effect of the deletion is to suggest that the Harlem Renaissance was a mono racial movement rather than a cosmopolitan one in which people of various colors and ethnicities participated. In 1925, Reiss offered free tuition to the young Aaron Douglas, who had just arrived in Harlem. Reiss persuaded Locke to let Douglas contribute illustrations to the second edition of The New Negro.

His most outstanding commission was for the work performed on the Cincinnati Union Terminal in 1933 (it is now operated as the Cincinnati Museum Center).  He blended Art Deco with portraiture which captured the history of Cincinnati through its people. He painted fourteen murals in the passenger concourse. In 1973, with the rise of air transportation, these were removed to the public spaces of the Cincinnati/Northern Kentucky International Airport, where they would be seen by more people.

In 2015, with a major renovation and upgrade projected for the airport, nine of the murals were moved to the Cincinnati Convention Center, at a cost of $1.4 million.

Reiss was known for painting a broad cross section of peoples in the United States. His portraits were considered to be both compassionate and objective, moreso than any artist before him.

He died on August 29, 1953 in New York City. The Blackfeet spread his ashes along the eastern edge of Glacier National Park.

Architecture and design

His interior designs were influenced by the Vienna Secession. The lightness of style, use of grids, and gilded and highly colored panels refer more to the Wiener Werkstätte of Vienna than the Jugendstil of Munich. His designs for the Busy Lady Baking Company on 3620 Broadway (at 149th Street), and one at 4230 Broadway in 1915, were influenced by the designs of Josef Hoffmann and the Wiener Werkstätte, which he had seen a decade before. Another of his noted interior designs was for the Café Rumpelmayer in the Hotel St. Moritz in the 1930s. Study of the development of Reiss's work through the various decades shows that his floral abstractions of the 1930s and the sparse geometry of the 1940s were influenced by his early teachers and leading artists in Germany and Austria. His own commissions had an influence on American design and architecture.

Family 
Reiss married in Germany and his wife was pregnant when he left for the US in September 1913. Their son Winold Tjark Reiss (known as Tjark) was born in Germany on December 27, 1913. The mother and young son immigrated to join Reiss in New York in 1914. After attending local schools, Reiss studied at the Massachusetts Institute of Technology and in Vienna. He became an architect and worked in the United States. In 1996 he established the Reiss Partnership to create a vehicle for fostering awareness of his father's artistic legacy and to make it accessible to a broad public.

Gallery

References

External links 

1886 births
1953 deaths
20th-century American painters
20th-century American male artists
American male painters
Artists from Karlsruhe
German emigrants to the United States
American interior designers